The 1994 Women's World Open Squash Championship was the women's edition of the 1994 World Open, which serves as the individual world championship for squash players. The event took place in Saint Peter Port in Guernsey between 4 October and 9 October 1994. Michelle Martin won her second World Open title, defeating Cassie Jackman in the final.

Seeds

First round

Second round To final

See also
World Open
1994 Men's World Open Squash Championship

References

External links
Womens World Open

1994 in squash
World Squash Championships
Sport in Guernsey
1994 in Guernsey
1994 in women's squash
International sports competitions hosted by the Channel Islands
Squash in the Channel Islands
Sports competitions in Guernsey